The following highways are/were numbered 940:

Canada

United States